The Gin Gangster is a South Korean single-place, paraglider that was designed by Gin Seok Song and produced by Gin Gliders of Yongin. It is now out of production.

Design and development
The Gangster was designed as an intermediate performance glider, to replace the Gin Bandit in the company product line. The models are each named for their relative size.

Variants
Gangster XS
Extra small-sized model for light pilots. The glider model is DHV 2 certified.
Gangster S
Small-sized model for lighter pilots. The glider model is DHV 2 certified.
Gangster M
Mid-sized model for medium-weight pilots. The glider model is DHV 2 certified.
Gangster L
Large-sized model for heavier pilots. The glider model is DHV 2 certified.

Specifications (Gangster L)

References

Gangster
Paragliders